Nkechi is the shortened form of Nkechinyere, an Igbo-language female given name of Nigeria. It means "what god has given" or "gift of god". The name may refer to:
 Nkechi Akashili (born 1990), Nigerian basketball player
 Nkechi Anayo-Iloputaife, Nigerian pastor and televangelist
 Nkechi Amare Diallo (born 1977), American multimedia artist
 Nkechi Egbe (born 1978), Nigerian former football forward
 Nkechi Ikpeazu (born in the early 1960s), Nigerian politician
 Nkechi Mbilitam (born 1974), Nigerian former football midfielder
 Nkechi Justina Nwaogu (born 1956), Nigerian senator
 Nkechi Opara (born 1995), Nigerian weightlifter
 Nkechi Madubuko (born 1972), German sociologist and writer

References

African feminine given names
Igbo names